Voliba gigantea is a moth in the family Crambidae. It was described by George Hampson in 1912. It is found in Papua New Guinea.

Subspecies
Voliba gigantea gigantea (Papua New Guinea)
Voliba gigantea rungsi (P. Leraut, 2012) (Morocco)

References

Moths described in 1912
Spilomelinae